Zagato is an independent coachbuilding company and total design centre located northwest of Milan in Terrazzano, a small village near Rho, Lombardy, Italy. The company's premises occupies an area of 23,000 square metres (250,000 sq ft)- 11,000 of which is covered.

History

The 1910s: Aeronautics
Ugo Zagato was an Italian automotive designer and builder. He was born in Gavello, near Rovigo (June 25, 1890). He began his coachbuilding career in 1919 when he left Officine Aeronautiche Pomilio to set up his own business in Milan. His intent was to transfer sophisticated constructional techniques that combined lightness with strength from aeronautics to the automotive sector. Cars of the time were still bulky and heavy. Ugo Zagato conceived them as lightweight structures, with a frame in sheet aluminum similar to an aircraft fuselage.

The 1920s: Classic models
During the 20s  Zagato concentrated on racing cars. At the beginning of the decade he was asked by Alfa Romeo to dress some Alfa Romeo G1, RL and RM. But in 1925, Vittorio Jano, Alfa Romeo's Chief Engineer, asked him to create a body for the Alfa 6C 1500, the Alfa Romeo P2’s heir, which should be light and fast. Zagato, using his Aeronautics culture, succeeded in creating a sleek and light body for the car, which scored a 2nd place OA at the 1927 Mille Miglia and it won the 1928 edition. The 6C 1500 technical qualities were also improved on the Alfa Romeo 6C 1750, which was introduced in 1927. It was bodied in several versions (Turismo, Sport or Granturismo, Super Sport or Gran Sport) and achieved overall victories in the Mille Miglia in 1929 (Campari-Ramponi) and 1930 (Tazio Nuvolari, Achille Varzi, Giuseppe Campari and Pietro Ghersi filled the first four places). Enzo Ferrari, who started his career at Alfa Romeo, in 1929 founded Scuderia Ferrari as the official team for race Alfas. Ugo Zagato was his exclusive partner in the thirties. In those years, even Ansaldo, Bugatti, Diatto, Fiat, Isotta Fraschini, Lancia, Maserati, OM and even Rolls-Royce were clients of Zagato.

The 1930s: Aerodynamic models
Zagato continued to build a variety of aerodynamic cars during these decades, adopting inclined windscreens, more aerodynamic headlights, and convex bootlids. He also favored perforated disc wheels that improved brake cooling. All Alfa Romeo 8Cs received coach-work from Zagato. In January 1932, Zagato-bodied cars also began to be built by Carrozzeria Brianza. Bianchi, Fiat, Isotta Fraschini, Lancia, Maserati, and OM all experienced the lightweight and aerodynamic Zagato bodies, especially for race cars. The list of victories is impressive, including 8 Mille Miglia, 4 Targa Florio, 4 Le Mans, and 4 Spa Francorchamps OA victories. In the 30s, Zagato-bodied models started to compete and dominate in different class/categories. Thirty-six Zagato-bodied cars were at the start of the 1938 Mille Miglia. One third of the participants.

The 1940s: Panoramic Models

At the outbreak of the Second World War, Ugo Zagato left Milan and fled to Lake Maggiore. On 13 August 1943, a RAF bombing raid destroyed his coachworks in Corso Sempione road. He found new premises at Saronno, alongside the Isotta Fraschini works, on behalf of which he constructed trucks and military vehicles and a futuristic Monterosa. He returned to Milan at the end of the war and re-established his company at Via Giorgini 16, close to the Alfa Romeo historic home at Portello.

He looked for more spacious and more comfortable car greenhouses, which were eventually crystallised in a new type-form characterized by airiness and visibility thanks to large glazed areas made in plexiglass, a new material which replaced the traditional heavy glass. This “Panoramica” body, as it was called, would mark the rebirth of his coachwork: Alfa Romeo, Fiat, Lancia, Maserati and MG were “dressed” with this innovative body. In 1949 he built a Panoramic body for the Ferrari 166 Mille Miglia, belonging to Antonio Stagnoli - this was the first Ferrari coupé for a client ever. The Panoramic concept was an invention of Vieri Rapi, chief Zagato stylist at that time.

The 1950s: Gran Turismo Models
 In 1947, as a gift for his graduation at Bocconi University of Milan, Elio Zagato, Ugo's first-born son, received an open-top sports car based on a Fiat 500 B chassis. This car represented the beginning of his career as a gentleman driver (out of 160 races, Elio earned a place on the podium 83 times) and as a manager of the family company. The birth of the Gran Turismo category, conceived in 1949 by Count Giovanni Lurani, journalist Giovanni Canestrini and Elio himself revolutionised the world of automotive competition: the category comprised cars with sports coachwork and a production chassis or bodyshell. In order to take part in that competitions there should be 30 examples built.
AC, Alfa Romeo, Abarth, Aston Martin, Bristol, Ferrari, Fiat, Fraser Nash, Maserati, Jaguar, Osca, Porsche, Renault wore Zagato GT bodies.
In 1955 Elio Zagato scored a victory of the International Granturism Championship at the Avus circuit driving a Fiat 8V GT Zagato.

The 1960s: Fuoriserie models

The steady higher demand for special bodies required a passage from a handcraft to an industrially-based organization. Elio Zagato found a larger location at 30 Via Arese in Terrazzano (northwest of Milan), very close to Arese where Alfa Romeo as well would soon choose to establish its new plants. In 1960 Ugo Zagato was awarded with the Compasso d’Oro design prize for the design of the Fiat Abarth 1000 Zagato.

In this period the mission of Zagato was to design special bodies to be assembled in series and fitted with mechanical parts and interiors supplied by major constructors.
Under the partnership with Alfa Romeo the Giulia SZ, the TZ, TZ2, 2600 SZ, the 1750 4R and the Junior Zagato were born.
In partnership with Lancia, Zagato continued the “Sport” series with the Lancia Appia Sport, the Flaminia Sport and Super Sport, the Flavia Sport and Supersport and the Fulvia Sport and Sport Spider.
In addition to these some were realized for special customers owners of: Bristol, Fiat, Ford, Lamborghini, Honda, Osca, Rover and Volvo.

The 1970s: Geometric models

In response to the Oil Crisis and in contrast to the irrational and anti-functionalist trends of the era, Zagato also proposed the production of electric cars such as the  Zagato Zele two-seater.
In 1971 a new Ferrari Zagato, called 3Z, came to life thanks to an idea of Luigi Chinetti who financed the decidedly angular spider. In the same year it was introduced at the Turin Motor Show and signalled the definitive departure from SZ, TZ and Lancia Flaminia and Appia's curvy volumes to embrace the squared volumes of Lancia Fulvia Sport and Alfa Romeo Junior Z. Chinetti himself made a further special order. At that time Zagato started a new project for a different four-seater, mid engined concept which became the Cadillac N.A.R.T. This would be a luxurious, sophisticated, high performance four-seater. The front wheel drive power train of a Cadillac Eldorado was relocated to create a mid-engined layout. Zagato was asked to build the prototype from the drawings and a clay model that was conceived in GM's studios. A Fiat, based on 132, and named Aster, was bodied as prototype as well as a Volvo GTZ. The Zagato facility in Terrazzano saw also the assembly of Lancia Beta Sport Spider that established Lancia's name in America and Australia and the Bristol 407 convertible, whose design was very similar to the Lancia's one.

The 1980s: Limited Edition models
While the beginning of the 80's was characterized by the introduction of a number of Alfa Romeo Concept cars as the Fiat Chicane, the Alfa Romeos rear engine Sprint 6, Zeta 6, Alfetta and Lancia Thema Station Wagon, and the Alfa Romeo 33 Tempo Libero also in 4x4 hybrid version, the demand for exclusive spiders and coupes led Zagato to the creation of limited, numbered editions. The Aston Martin Vantage (50 units) and Volante Zagato (33 units) were the highest expression of this economic and commercial climate. Furthermore, the Milanese coachbuilder bodied the Maserati Spyder and Maserati Karif. Furthermore, the Alfa Romeo SZ (1989) and roadster named RZ (1991) were assembled here for Alfa Romeo. Both cars were born by the first application of CAD process to automobile. The SZ was an experimental coupé that revisited Alfa Romeo's sporting image, a rear-wheel drive Alfa Romeo coupé, a symbol of sporting pedigree. It harks back to the philosophy of the extreme coupés that distinguishes the historic Alfa - Zagato relationship: the 1900 SSZ 1954, the Giulietta SZ 1960, the Alfa Romeo Giulia TZ and Alfa Romeo Giulia TZ2 and the 2600 SZ 1965, Junior Z and Alfa Romeo Zeta 6.

The 1990s: V-Max models
Zagato faced the need to keep up with the new demands of an evolving market: besides organising, from 1993, a one-make race series for Alfa Romeo SZ and RZ so it turned (was no longer just a coachbuilder Atelier tied to  the assembly of sports cars) into  a Total Design Studio now working in the extended area of transportation design.
The company styled and built not only prototypes and show cars on behalf of car manufacturers but also railways and industrial vehicles.

In 1991 and 1993, the Design Zagato division introduced two Ferrari V-Max models based on the 348 and the Testarossa where styling motifs subsequently adopted on the F355 and 360 Modena and on the Enzo. In 1992, as a tribute to the Lancia Delta Integrale victories, the Hyena V-Max concept was created and a small series of 25 cars were built. Zagato built the Raptor and the Superdiablo V-Max concept, both powered by a Lamborghini V12 at the request of Mike Kimberley Sant’Agata Bolognese company's CEO. Elected “Best Concept” at the 1996 edition of the Geneva Motor Show, the Raptor was produced in less than 4 months, thanks to the use of integrated technology applied to the CAD/CAM/CAE system that allowed the intermediate styling buck phase to be eliminated. In 1998, Zagato was commissioned by FIAT to design and produce three V-Max prototypes with low fuel consumption (3 litres/100 kilometres). The Fiat Ecobasis was judged to be the best research V-Max concept.

The 2000s

Special projects created for Aston Martin, Bentley, Ferrari, Maserati, Spyker, Diatto, and Alfa Romeo consolidate the brand's business in making custom-built models, almost exclusively coupés with two doors and two seats.

The 2010s
The Alfa Romeo TZ3 Corsa and Stradale; the race model based on a mono-shell carbon fiber chassis, coupled with a tubular frame and a lightweight aluminium body, the street legal model based on the Viper ACR mechanical chassis with its carbon fiber body. Due to the joint venture between the Fiat and the Chrysler groups the TZ3 Stradale became the first American Alfa Romeo. After Fiat 500 coupé Zagato and AC 378 GTZ, Zagato consolidated its special relationship with Aston Martin by designing the Centennial V-Max models (as a tribute to AML 100 years), the Vanquish Family and - for the “Cento” years from Zagato foundation – the Pair and the Twins collections. Also Porsche liaison has been revamped with the family of Zagato Carreras as well as Lamborghini, Maserati and BMW connection with the 575, the Mostro and the BMW Twins collections. Last but not least Zagato has been supporting – since 2017 -  the revamp of the luxury sport Italian Brand: ISO Rivolta.
Zagato also designed non-automobile projects such as an automated guided electric commuter train for Masdar City in Abu Dhabi. In 2019, Zagato marked it's centenary.

Timeline

 1922: Fiat 501
 1922: Diatto Tipo 25 4DS
 1925: Lancia Lambda
 1929: Alfa Romeo 6C 1500
 1929: Alfa Romeo 6C 1750 GS
 1930: Alfa Romeo 6C 1750 GS Testa Fissa
 1932: Alfa Romeo 6C 1750
 1932: Alfa Romeo 8C 2300
 1937: Alfa Romeo 8C 2900
 1938: Fiat 1500 Spider MM
 1938: Fiat 500 Siata
 1938: Lancia Aprilia Sport MM
 1938: Lancia Aprilia Sport Aerodinamica
 1947: Fiat 500 B Panoramica
 1947: Isotta Fraschini 8C Monterosa
 1948: Ferrari 166 MM Panoramica
 1949: Maserati A6 1500 Panoramica
 1952: Fiat 500 "Topolino" CZ
 1952: Fiat 8V Zagato
 1953: Osca 4500 Biondetti
 1954: Maserati A6G/54 2000 Zagato Berlinetta
 1955: Alfa Romeo 1900C SS Zagato Coupe
 1955: Maserati A6G/54 2000 Zagato Spyder (one-off)
 1956: Maserati A6G/54 2000 Zagato Coupé Speciale (one-off)
 1956: Fiat Abarth 750 GT
 1958: AC Ace-Bristol Zagato
 1957: Alfa Romeo Giulietta SZ
 1957: Jaguar XK 140 Z
 1957: Lancia Appia GT
 1957: Maserati 450S Costin Coupé (Zagato bodied)
 1958: Lancia Flaminia Sport
 1960: Fiat Abarth 1000
 1960: Aston Martin DB4 GT Zagato
 1960: Bristol 406
 1961: Bristol 407
 1962: Osca 1600 GTZ
 1962: Alfa Romeo 2600 SZ
 1962: Lancia Flaminia Tubolare
 1962: Lancia Flavia Sport
 1963: Alfa Romeo Giulia TZ
 1964: Lancia Flaminia Super Sport
 1965: Alfa Romeo Gran Sport Quattroruote
 1965: Lamborghini 3500 GTZ
 1966: Lancia Fulvia Sport
 1967: Lancia Flavia Super Sport
 1967: Shelby Zagato
 1969: Alfa Romeo Junior Z
 1969: Volvo GTZ
 1970: Cadillac Eldorado NART
 1972: Iso Varedo
 1972: Alfa Romeo 1600 Junior Z
 1972: Fiat Zagato Aster
 1974: Zagato Zele 1000
 1975: Bristol 412
 1976: Lancia Beta Spider (Designed by Pininfarina, Zagato bodied)
 1984: Maserati Spyder
 1986: Aston Martin V8 Zagato
 1988: Autech Stelvio
 1988: Maserati Karif (Zagato bodied)
 1989: Alfa Romeo SZ (Zagato bodied)
 1991: Ferrari 348 Zagato Elaborazione
 1991: Autech Gavia
 1992: Alfa Romeo RZ (Zagato bodied)
 1992: Lancia Hyena
 1992: Fiat 500 Z-ECO
 1993: F.I.V.E Formula Junior Elettrosolare
 1993: Ferrari FZ93 (Renamed ES1)
 1993: Autech Gavia
 1996: Fiat Bravobis
 1996: Zagato Raptor
 1997: Lamborghini Canto
 2001: Alfa Romeo 147 Spider Concept Zagato
 2002: Alfa Romeo 147 GTA.Z
 2002: Aston Martin DB7 Zagato
 2003: Aston Martin DB AR1
 2004: Aston Martin Vanquish Zagato Roadster
 2004: Lancia Fulvia Sport Concept
 2005: Lancia Ypsilon Sport
 2006: Ferrari 575 GTZ
 2006: Toyota Harrier Zagato
 2007: Maserati GS Zagato
 2007: Zagato 599 GTZ Nibbio
 2007: Zagato 599 GTZ Nibbio Spyder
 2008: Spyker C12 Zagato
 2008: Bentley Continental GTZ
 2008: Diatto Ottovù Zagato
 2008: Perana Z-One
 2009: Ferrari 550 GTZ Barchetta
 2010: Alfa Romeo TZ3 Corsa
 2011: Fiat 500 Coupe
 2011: Alfa Romeo TZ3 Stradale
 2011: Aston Martin V12 Zagato
 2012: AC 378 GT Zagato
 2012: BMW Zagato Coupe
 2012: BMW Zagato Roadster
 2013: Aston Martin DBS Coupe Zagato Centennial
 2013: Aston Martin DB9 Spyder Zagato Centennial
 2013: Porsche Carrera GTZ
 2014: Lamborghini 5-95 Zagato
 2014: Aston Martin Virage Zagato Shooting Brake
 2015: Thunder Power Sedan
 2015: Zagato Maserati Mostro
 2016: Aston Martin Vanquish Zagato
 2016: MV Agusta F4Z
 2017: IsoRivolta Zagato Vision Gran Turismo 
 2017:  Aston Martin Vanquish Zagato Volante
 2018:  Aston Martin Vanquish Zagato Speedster
 2018:  Aston Martin Vanquish Zagato Shooting Brake
 2018: Lamborghini L595 Zagato Roadster
 2020: Aston Martin DBS GT Zagato Centenary
 2020: IsoRivolta GTZ
 2022 : Zagato Maserati Mostro Barchetta
 2023 : Alfa Romeo Giulia SWB Zagato

Notable designers
 Ugo Zagato
 Vieri Rapi
 Ercole Spada
 Giuseppe Mittino
 Marco Pedracini
 Norihiko Harada

See also 

List of Italian companies

Notes

External links

 http://www.zagato.it/
 Coachbuild.com encyclopedia: Zagato
 https://www.flickr.com/groups/zagato/pool/
 https://web.archive.org/web/20090227085303/http://www.zagato-cars.co.uk/ Broughtons Zagato Ambassador UK
 Elio Zagato - Daily Telegraph obituary

Car manufacturers of Italy
Coachbuilders of Italy
Automobile designers
Automotive motorsports and performance companies
Vehicle manufacturing companies established in 1919
Italian companies established in 1919
Italian brands